John Blake may refer to:

Arts and entertainment
John Blake Jr. (1947–2014), American jazz violinist
John Blake (journalist) (born 1948), British journalist and publisher
John Blake (make-up artist), 1992 Academy Award nominated makeup artist
John Blake, fictional character in the 2012 film The Dark Knight Rises

Politics
John Blake (Leicester MP) in 1340 represented Leicester (UK Parliament constituency)
John Blake (Winchester MP), MP for Winchester
John Blake (MP for Calne), MP for Calne in 1415
John Blake fitz William, mayor of Galway in 1487–88
John Blake Jr. (politician) (1762–1826), United States Representative from New York
John Aloysius Blake (1826–1887), British politician, Member of Parliament
John L. Blake (1831–1899), United States Representative from New Jersey
John Blake (Pennsylvania politician) (born 1960), Member of the Pennsylvania State Senate

Sports
J. P. Blake (John Percy Blake, 1874–1950), British Olympic fencer
Jere Blake (John Blake, 1875–1933), Wales rugby player
Bandsman Jack Blake (1890–1960), British boxer born John Blake
John Blake (cricketer) (1917–1944), English cricketer
John Blake (rugby union) (1933–1982), Bristol rugby player and teacher
John Blake (hurler) (born 1957), Irish retired hurler
John Blake (American football) (1961–2020), American football coach
John Vaughn Blake (1888–1964), American football player and FBI agent

Others
John Blake (soldier) (1856–1907), Irish-American soldier and adventurer
John Bradby Blake (1745–1773), British botanist
John F. Blake (1922–1995), American intelligence official
John Frederick Blake (1839–1906), British geologist and clergyman
John Henry Blake (1808–1882), Irish land agent
John Lauris Blake (1788–1858), American clergyman and author
John T. Blake (c. 1901–1987), American research scientist
John Thomas Blake (1853–1940), New Zealand surveyor, interpreter, land agent, historian, racehorse owner and trainer
John Rennie Blake (1825–1900), faculty chairman in charge of Davidson College, 1871–1877

See also
John Blake House, 1794 built and 1984 registered historic house in New York, named after John Blake, Jr. (politician)
Jon Blake (disambiguation)
John Blake Dillon (1814–1866), Irish writer and politician